Rhett S. James is a Latter-day Saint author and educator.  He is also a playwright.

James was a teacher at the Logan Institute of Religion for 27 years. He was the author of Martin Harris: The Man who Knew.

In response to writings by D. Michael Quinn, James has also co-written with George L. Milton apologetic defenses of Joseph Smith and Evan Stephens.

Between about 1969 and 1970, James supervised the training of the first seminary and institute teachers in New Zealand. He was involved in starting the LDS Seminary and Institute program in New Zealand.

James has more recently been a professor at LDS Business College.

James has also edited historical documents related to Native Americans in the early period of Mormon settlement in Utah.

Notes

References
Neal A. Maxwell institute author bio page
Utah State University archive statement on James role with Harris pageant.

20th-century American dramatists and playwrights
American Latter Day Saint writers
Church Educational System instructors
Living people
Ensign College alumni
Latter Day Saints from Utah
20th-century American non-fiction writers
Year of birth missing (living people)